Kiwira is an administrative ward in the Rungwe district of the Mbeya Region of Tanzania. In 2016 the Tanzania National Bureau of Statistics report there were 27,822 people in the ward, from 25,244 in 2012.

Villages and hamlets 
The ward has 5 villages, and 28 hamlets.

 Ibula
 Ibula
 Kanyegele
 Katela
 Kibumbe
 Sanu - Salala Kalongo
 Ilolo
 Ibigi
 Ilolo
 Itekele
 Kisungu
 Masebe
 Masugwa
 Ilundo
 Bujinga
 Buswema
 Ibagha A
 Ibagha B
 Kanyambala
 Lusungo
 Kikota
 Ilamba
 Ipande
 Kang'eng'e
 Kikota
 Lubwe
 Lukwego
 Mpandapanda
 Ilongoboto
 Ipoma
 Isange
 Kiwira kati
 Mpandapanda

References 

Wards of Mbeya Region